KALU (89.3 FM) is a non-commercial educational radio station broadcasting an urban contemporary music format with some talk radio programming, licensed to Langston, Oklahoma, United States. Established in 1975, the station is owned by Langston University. KALU is operated by the University's Department of Broadcast Journalism and School of Arts and Sciences

References

External links
 Official Website
 

Talk radio stations in the United States
Langston University
Urban contemporary radio stations in the United States
Radio stations established in 1975
1975 establishments in Oklahoma
Logan County, Oklahoma
ALU